In common usage, a butter knife may refer to any non-serrated table knife designed with a dull edge and rounded point; formal cutlery patterns make a distinction between such a place knife (or table knife) and a butter knife.  In this usage, a butter knife (or master butter knife) is a sharp-pointed, dull-edged knife, often with a sabre shape, used only to serve out pats of butter from a central butter dish to individual diners' plates. Master butter knives are not used to spread the butter onto bread: this would contaminate the butter remaining in the butter dish when the next pat of butter was served. Rather, diners at the breakfast, the luncheon, and the informal dinner table use an individual butter knife to apply butter to their bread. Individual butter knives have a round point, so as not to tear the bread, and are sometimes termed butter spreaders. If no butter spreaders are provided, a dinner knife may be used as an alternative.

See also
Cutlery
Table setting

References

Serving utensils
Kitchen knives
Butter

ja:ナイフ#テーブルナイフ